The Societies' Borrowing Powers Act 1898 (61 & 62 Vict. c.15), long title An Act to empower certain Societies to borrow Money from Persons and Corporations other than Members, was an Act of Parliament of the Parliament of the United Kingdom, given the Royal Assent on 25 July 1898 and repealed in 1974.

The Act provided that a society was permitted to institute a rule allowing it to take deposits and borrow money (at interest) from its members and from any other persons; as soon as such a rule was registered it was permitted to do so.

The Act stipulated that the society had to be registered under the Friendly Societies Act 1896, and have as its object the creation of funds to be lent out for the benefit of the members of the society (or to members of the society), with rules in place to prevent the division of the funds among its members by dividends, profits or the like, and to ensure that all loans were to be applied for purposes of which the society approved.

The Act was repealed by the Friendly Societies Act 1974.

References

United Kingdom Acts of Parliament 1898
Repealed United Kingdom Acts of Parliament